Walter Thomas McGovern (May 24, 1922 – July 8, 2021) was a United States district judge of the United States District Court for the Western District of Washington.

Education and career

Born in Seattle, Washington in May 1922, McGovern received a Bachelor of Arts degree from the University of Washington in 1949 and a Bachelor of Laws from the University of Washington School of Law in 1950. He was in private practice in Seattle from 1950 to 1959. He was a judge of the Municipal Court of Seattle from 1959 to 1965, on the King County Superior Court from 1965 to 1968, and on the Washington State Supreme Court from 1968 to 1971.

Federal judicial service

On March 29, 1971, McGovern was nominated by President Richard Nixon to a seat on the United States District Court for the Western District of Washington vacated by Judge William James Lindberg. McGovern was confirmed by the United States Senate on April 21, 1971, and received his commission on April 23, 1971. He served as Chief Judge from 1975 to 1987, assuming senior status on September 30, 1987. He died on July 8, 2021 at the age of 99.

See also
 List of United States federal judges by longevity of service

References

Sources
 

1922 births
2021 deaths
Lawyers from Seattle
University of Washington alumni
Justices of the Washington Supreme Court
Judges of the United States District Court for the Western District of Washington
United States district court judges appointed by Richard Nixon
20th-century American judges
University of Washington School of Law alumni
21st-century American judges